Wójtostwo may refer to the following places:
Wójtostwo, Pajęczno County in Łódź Voivodeship (central Poland)
Wójtostwo, Piotrków County in Łódź Voivodeship (central Poland)
Wójtostwo, Kozienice County in Masovian Voivodeship (east-central Poland)
Wójtostwo, Nowy Dwór Mazowiecki County in Masovian Voivodeship (east-central Poland)
Wójtostwo, Greater Poland Voivodeship (west-central Poland)